Jin Xiaomei (born January 1, 1983, in Weifang, Shandong) is a female Chinese football (soccer) player who competed in the 2004 Summer Olympics.

In 2004, she finished ninth with the Chinese team in the women's tournament. She played both matches.

External links

1983 births
Living people
Chinese women's footballers
Footballers at the 2004 Summer Olympics
Olympic footballers of China
People from Weifang
Footballers from Shandong
China women's international footballers
Women's association footballers not categorized by position